Silvia Elena Santelices Rojas (born 27 June 1940) is a Chilean theater, film, and television actress, a pioneer of telenovelas in her country. She currently serves as councilor for the commune of Rancagua.

Professional career
In 1960 Santelices entered the Catholic University of Chile to study theater. While still a student, she joined the nascent dramatic department of her alma mater's television station, Canal 13, where she initially participated in televised plays.

She also played Lucia Solar, mother of Teresa of the Andes (played by Paulina Urrutia) in TVN's miniseries  (1989).

After years of absence from television, in 2005 she participated in the television series Brujas, and has joined other dramatic productions such as Papi Ricky and Veinteañero a los 40.

She is known for having a great stage presence, characteristic smooth voice, and great interpretive power. Since the late 1990s she has lived in the city of Rancagua, where she is part of Casa del Arte Theater Company.

Political career
In the 1970s Santelices was a supporter of Popular Unity. The 1973 coup d'état took her by surprise in Venezuela, where she was exiled for five years.

She was elected councilor of Rancagua in the municipal elections of 2008 on behalf of the Socialist Party. In the 2012 elections she returned to obtain a seat on the Municipal Council of Rancagua, receiving 4,533 votes, corresponding to 6.38%, obtaining the third communal majority.

Telenovelas

Other TV series

References

External links
 

1940 births
20th-century Chilean actresses
21st-century Chilean actresses
Actresses from Santiago
Chilean stage actresses
Chilean telenovela actresses
Living people
Socialist Party of Chile politicians
Pontifical Catholic University of Chile alumni